Anthony Falson (born 25 July 1953) is an Australian former water polo player who competed in the 1980 Summer Olympics.

References

1953 births
Living people
Australian male water polo players
Olympic water polo players of Australia
Water polo players at the 1980 Summer Olympics